The American Society of Hypertension (abbreviated ASH) was an American non-profit professional society dedicated to advancing research on hypertension and related cardiovascular diseases.

History
The ASH was founded in 1985 by 17 scientists and physicians. In 2005, the ASH cut ties with the American Journal of Hypertension over a dispute over control of content published in the Journal. In 2006, the society became the center of a dispute over the appropriate role of pharmaceutical industry in medical research. The dispute prompted several members of an ASH group convened to write a new definition of high blood pressure to resign from the group; those resigning included former ASH president Michael H. Alderman.  In 2017, the society dissolved and merged with the American Heart Association. The Journal of the American Society of Hypertension, which was originally the official journal of the ASH, is now affiliated with the AHA.

References

Hypertension
Medical associations based in the United States
Organizations established in 1985
Organizations disestablished in 2017
1985 establishments in the United States